In mathematics, Frobenius' theorem gives necessary and sufficient conditions for finding a maximal set of independent solutions of an overdetermined system  of first-order homogeneous linear partial differential equations. In modern geometric terms, given a family of vector fields, the theorem gives necessary and sufficient integrability conditions for the existence of a foliation by maximal integral manifolds whose tangent bundles are spanned by the given vector fields. The theorem generalizes the existence theorem for ordinary differential equations, which guarantees that a single vector field always gives rise to integral curves; Frobenius gives compatibility conditions under which the integral curves of r vector fields mesh into coordinate grids on r-dimensional integral manifolds.  The theorem is foundational in differential topology and calculus on manifolds.

Introduction

In its most elementary form, the theorem addresses the problem of finding a maximal set of independent solutions of a regular system of first-order linear homogeneous partial differential equations. Let

Consider the following system of partial differential equations for a  function :

One seeks conditions on the existence of a collection of solutions  such that the gradients  are linearly independent.

The Frobenius theorem asserts that this problem admits a solution locally if, and only if, the operators  satisfy a certain integrability condition known as involutivity. Specifically, they must satisfy relations of the form

The involutivity condition is a generalization of the commutativity of partial derivatives.

From analysis to geometry 
Even though the system is overdetermined there are typically infinitely many solutions.  For example, the system of differential equations

clearly permits multiple solutions. Nevertheless, these solutions still have enough structure that they may be completely described. The first observation is that, even if f1 and f2 are two different solutions, the level surfaces of f1 and f2 must overlap. The second observation is that, once the level surfaces are known, all solutions can then be given in terms of an arbitrary function. Since the value of a solution f on a level surface is constant by definition, define a function C(t) by:

Conversely, if a function  is given, then each function f given by this expression is a solution of the original equation.  Thus, because of the existence of a family of level surfaces, solutions of the original equation are in a one-to-one correspondence with arbitrary functions of one variable.

Frobenius' theorem allows one to establish a similar such correspondence for the more general case of solutions of (1). Suppose that  are solutions of the problem (1) satisfying the independence condition on the gradients. If  is another such collection of solutions, one can show (using some linear algebra and the mean value theorem) that this has the same family of level sets but with a possibly different choice of constants for each set. Thus, even though the independent solutions of (1) are not unique, the equation (1) nonetheless determines a unique family of level sets. Just as in the case of the example, general solutions u of (1) are in a one-to-one correspondence with (continuously differentiable) functions on the family of level sets.

The level sets corresponding to the maximal independent solution sets of (1) are called the integral manifolds because functions on the collection of all integral manifolds correspond in some sense to constants of integration.  Once one of these constants of integration is known, then the corresponding solution is also known.

Frobenius' theorem in modern language
The Frobenius theorem can be restated more economically in modern language.  Frobenius' original version of the theorem was stated in terms of Pfaffian systems, which today can be translated into the language of differential forms. An alternative formulation, which is somewhat more intuitive, uses vector fields.

Formulation using vector fields
In the vector field formulation, the theorem states that a subbundle of the tangent bundle of a manifold is integrable (or involutive) if and only if it arises from a regular foliation.  In this context, the Frobenius theorem relates integrability to foliation; to state the theorem, both concepts must be clearly defined.

One begins by noting that an arbitrary smooth vector field  on a manifold  defines a family of curves, its integral curves  (for intervals ). Thus, one-dimensional subbundles are always integrable.

If the subbundle has dimension greater than one, a condition needs to be imposed.

Several definitions of foliation exist. Here we use the following:

Definition. A p-dimensional, class Cr foliation of an n-dimensional manifold M is a decomposition of M into a union of disjoint connected submanifolds {Lα}α∈A, called the leaves of the foliation, with the following property: Every point in M has a neighborhood U and a system of local, class Cr coordinates x=(x1, ⋅⋅⋅, xn) : U→Rn such that for each leaf Lα, the components of U ∩ Lα are described by the equations xp+1=constant, ⋅⋅⋅, xn=constant. A foliation is denoted by ={Lα}α∈A.

Frobenius' theorem states that the converse is also true:

Differential forms formulation

Geometrically, the theorem states that an integrable module of -forms of rank r is the same thing as a codimension-r foliation. The correspondence to the definition in terms of vector fields given in the introduction follows from the close relationship between differential forms and Lie derivatives. Frobenius' theorem is one of the basic tools for the study of vector fields and foliations.

There are thus two forms of the theorem: one which operates with distributions, that is smooth subbundles D of the tangent bundle TM; and the other which operates with subbundles of the graded ring  of all forms on M.  These two forms are related by duality.

for all . Furthermore, using the definition of the exterior derivative, it can be shown that I(D) is closed under exterior differentiation (it is a differential ideal) if and only if D is involutive. Consequently, the Frobenius theorem takes on the equivalent form that  is closed under exterior differentiation if and only if D is integrable.

Generalizations
The theorem may be generalized in a variety of ways.

Infinite dimensions
One infinite-dimensional generalization is as follows. Let  and  be Banach spaces, and  a pair of open sets. Let

be a continuously differentiable function of the Cartesian product (which inherits a differentiable structure from its inclusion into X × Y) into the space  of continuous linear transformations of  into Y.  A differentiable mapping u : A → B is a solution of the differential equation

if

The equation (1) is completely integrable if for each , there is a neighborhood U of x0 such that (1) has a unique solution  defined on U such that u(x0)=y0.

If it is R, then assume F is continuously differentiable. Then (1) is completely integrable at each point of  if and only if

for all .

Banach manifolds 
The infinite-dimensional version of the Frobenius theorem also holds on Banach manifolds.  The statement is essentially the same as the finite-dimensional version.

Let  be a Banach manifold of class at least C2.

The Frobenius theorem states that a subbundle  is integrable if and only if it is involutive.

Holomorphic forms

Specifically, if  are r linearly independent holomorphic 1-forms on an open set in  such that

for some system of holomorphic 1-forms , then there exist holomorphic functions fij and  such that, on a possibly smaller domain,

This result holds locally in the same sense as the other versions of the Frobenius theorem.

Higher degree forms
The statement does not generalize to higher degree forms, although there is a number of partial results such as Darboux's theorem and the Cartan-Kähler theorem.

History
Despite being named for Ferdinand Georg Frobenius, the theorem was first proven by Alfred Clebsch and Feodor Deahna. Deahna was the first to establish the sufficient conditions for the theorem, and Clebsch developed the necessary conditions. Frobenius is responsible for applying the theorem to Pfaffian systems, thus paving the way for its usage in differential topology.

Applications
 In classical mechanics, the integrability of a system's constraint equations determines whether the system is holonomic or nonholonomic.

See also
 Integrability conditions for differential systems
 Domain-straightening theorem
 Newlander-Nirenberg Theorem

Notes

References

Theorems in differential geometry
Theorems in differential topology
Differential systems
Foliations